Traklosiidae is a family of nematodes. It is in the superfamily Coronostomatoidea.

References

Nematode families